The 2013–14 Clemson Tigers men's basketball team represented Clemson University during the 2013–14 NCAA Division I men's basketball season. Led by fourth year head coach Brad Brownell, the Tigers played their home games at Littlejohn Coliseum as members of the Atlantic Coast Conference. They finished the season 23–13, 10–8 in ACC play to finish in sixth place. They advanced to the quarterfinals of the ACC tournament where they lost to Duke. They received an invitation to the National Invitation Tournament where they defeated Georgia State, Illinois and Belmont to advance to the semifinals where they lost to SMU.

Roster

Depth chart

Schedule

|-
!colspan=12 style="background:#522D80; color:#F66733;"| Non-conference regular season

|-
!colspan=12 style="background:#522D80; color:#F66733;"| ACC regular season

|-
!colspan=12 style="background:#522D80;"| ACC tournament

|-
!colspan=12 style="background:#522D80;"| NIT

Clemson Tigers men's basketball seasons
Clemson
Clemson